Habibabad District is a district (bakhsh) in Borkhar County, Isfahan Province, Iran. The District has three cities: Habibabad, Shadpurabad, and Komeshcheh.  At the 2006 census, its population was 22,074 and there were 5,668 families living in the district.  The District has one rural district (dehestan): Borkhar-e Sharqi Rural District.

References 

Borkhar County
Districts of Isfahan Province